Puzzle Agent 2 is an adventure/puzzle game by Telltale Games, in collaboration with Graham Annable. It is the sequel to Nelson Tethers: Puzzle Agent.  It was released on June 30, 2011.

Gameplay
Like the first installment, gameplay structure resembles a linear adventure game - the player doesn't have an inventory, but can traverse into dialog trees with other characters. Some items or choices of dialog result in puzzles to be solved, although in some cases the puzzle has no consequence in the game's progress. The types of puzzles vary from jigsaw through maths to logic puzzles. Each of them has a basic short description about the objective, while some have a basic set of rules and conditions that help the player deduce the solution. The player can request three hints for each puzzle, and each hint costs the player a piece of chewing gum - gum is on shortage in the town, as the hotel clerk explains, but Nelson can collect pieces of used gum he finds at each location. The puzzles don't automatically approve the players solution, even if the player provides the correct answer - Nelson must send the answer back to HQ where it is either approved or rejected. If the solution is approved, the player is given a score depending on how many hints he used and how many failed attempts he had (the latter is represented in taxpayer dollars), and an optional further explanation is provided on how the puzzle can be solved.

Plot

While on vacation, Tethers is still disturbed by the unresolved Scoggins case from the previous game, noting that the FBI appears to be trying to cover it up. Deciding to go on an unofficial investigation, Tethers leaves his colleague and admirer Jim Ingraham to look after his files and heads back to Scoggins.
 
Tethers rents a room at Valda's Inn, the local hotel. At night, he experiences a dream in which he is visited by an astronaut, just like his dream from the previous game, but this time they leave a note on the floor. When Tethers awakens, the note on the floor is still there, reading "Isaac Davner does not exist" on one side and a list of names for a number of unknown people on the other side, prompting Tethers to find out more about the names mentioned.
 
In town, Tethers learns from resident Darryl Boutin that the names are of past residents who have mysteriously disappeared in Sasimy Woods across the past several years, one of them being Darryl's brother, Darrel. Tethers travels to the Wallows local campsite to meet with anthropologist Alfred Versteckt, whose student Will Medlock is also mentioned in the list. Alfred, who is not native to Scoggins, believes the disappearances may be related to Scoggins' folklore, namely the Hidden People. Tethers meets with Sheriff Bahg to request access to his files on the 'missing persons' cases, but Bahg quickly denies him. However, Glori Davner, despite previously attempting to kill Tethers, offers to distract Bahg while Tethers breaks into his office if he promises to find Isaac, who was her husband. Glori claims that Isaac was being "troubled" by something, and the Brotherhood of Scoggins, led by Bjorn, had offered to help him. However, they actually had him locked away in the eraser factory at the mercy of the Hidden People, simply telling Glori that he had been "chosen". Glori believes the Brotherhood is behind the disappearances of the missing people.
 
Tethers sneaks into Bahg's office and is able to retrieve the Missing Persons files, which leads him to Melkorka Teterdottir, or 'Korka' for short, a puzzle-obsessed woman not unlike himself. Korka explains that she posted the note under his door at night in an attempt to summon him, as she wishes to partner with him to solve the case. Korka herself has made a remarkable discovery concerning Isaac: his true identity is Ed Davis, a test pilot who had apparently been killed after his craft crashed into Sasimy Woods. Korka believes that the alias of Davner was forged so that Ed Davis could be declared dead, but he is actually residing in the woods as a serial killer, and is therefore responsible for the disappearances. Having become obsessed with taking down Isaac after her lover, Halldor Magnusson, disappeared many years ago, Korka has devoted her recent years to tracking him, and now wishes to use Tethers to hunt him. Korka sends Tethers out into Sasimy Woods to find Isaac.
 
Tethers finds no sign of Isaac in the woods, but instead finds Edvard, a member of the Brotherhood, sneaking around. Tethers follows him through the woods, but loses him and tumbles down a slope. Beneath a tree at the base of the slope, Tethers discovers the crumpled body of an astronaut, but before he can look closer, a group of Hidden People spook him and he flees, ending up back at Korka's house. Korka quickly dismisses his findings as nonsense, thinking the Hidden People are simply an urban myth. With no other leads, Tethers heads to the Brotherhood lodge to directly interrogate Bjorn, but finds that he is both innocent and troubled by the missing people as well. Bjorn reveals that the Brotherhood members have also been vanishing in Sasimy Woods. Edvard, who Tethers had seen in the woods, was actually searching for Skjoldr, another Brotherhood member who recently went missing. Bjorn also states that the Hidden People have been "angered" by something nearby, which may have something to do with their "choosing" of Isaac. Bjorn directs Tethers to the cabin of Olav Welhaven, another past member who was one of Bjorn's best friends. Tethers reaches Olav's cabin and finds that the man was a dedicated astropsychologist who had invented a complex formula linking lunacy to lunar eclipses and had sent his research to NASA. Tethers revisits Korka to show her his findings, however Korka is revealed to be an obsessive lunatic when Tethers discovers that she believes the entire mystery revolves around the 'Kitimat Incident' - the rumoured discovery of a Sasquatch in Sasimy Woods.
 
Believing that Alfred is the only competent person in Scoggins, Tethers returns to the Wallows to show him his findings. Alfred is amazed by Olav's research, noting that combine his own research into the Hidden People, it will pinpoint the creatures' home. Alfred accompanies Tethers into the woods to look for the Hidden People, but soon disappears; Tethers searches for him and stumbles across a campsite in a large clearing. The campsite appears to have been built around a crashed lunar lander branded as 'Hermes II', and is occupied by a pair of astronauts. Tethers spots the remains of a skier nearby, but before he can react, the astronauts capture and sedate him.
 
Tethers wakes up once again in Valda's Inn, but gets a call from Ingraham that the FBI has discovered Tethers' findings about the astronaut, and a task force of Men in Black are en route to Scoggins. Tethers confronts FBI Director Jennings and voices his concern that the astronauts in the woods have been murdering people and are responsible for disappearances, but Jennings simply warns him to back away from the case and leave Scoggins before he learns too much. Refusing to abandon the case, Tethers returns to the astronaut's body he discovered in the woods and finds that it is not really a body, but an empty suit. Isaac Davner appears and states that the suit belonged to him. Isaac, previously known as Ed Davis, explains that he was among a team of astronauts who were sent to the Moon on the Hermes II mission, a secret operation in response to Olav Welhaven's research, in which the team was ordered to plant a device called the 'Lunar Ray' on the surface. However, a lunar eclipse occurred before the team reached the surface, causing the two astronauts on the outside of the craft to instantly go insane. With the Lunar Ray still attached to the lander, Isaac piloted the craft back towards Earth, where it crashed into Sasimy Woods - directly on top of the Hidden People's home. The Lunar Ray formed a barrier around the area, repelling the Hidden People, forcing them from their habitat. Isaac fled the two insane astronauts, and created the new identity of Isaac Davner in an attempt to forget the mission and start a new life. He settled down with Glori and began a peaceful career as the eraser factory foreman, but the astronauts continued to haunt him in his dreams so he went to Bjorn for help. The Hidden People, who were aware that Isaac had been involved in the Hermes II mission, had "chosen" him in an attempt to brainwash him into destroying the Ray. When Tethers watched him get dragged away into the woods at the end of the previous game, the Hidden People had actually taken him back to the lander, but he was unable to stop the Ray and went hiding into the woods again.
 
Now understanding that the Hidden People are simply being disturbed by the Ray, Tethers agrees to assist Isaac in destroying it. The two head to the lander, but find the Men in Black there, with the insane astronauts apprehended. The agents take the pair back to the town. Tethers receives another phone call from Ingraham, who has been studying Tethers' many recordings throughout his investigations. Ingraham points out that there is a strange melody in the background of Olav Welhaven's recording. Realizing that Olav must have had direct contact with the Hidden People, Tethers deduces that the melody was used to summon the Hidden People to the cabin. Tethers heads back to the cabin and replays the recording, causing a large crowd of Hidden People to enter, one of them climbing onto a stool and whispering into Tethers' ear.
 
As a result of the whispers, Tethers experiences a strange illusion in which he contacts the Hidden People in space, apparently agreeing to assist them in destroying the Ray. When he snaps back into consciousness, he is already at the lander in his underwear, surrounded by agents. Tethers is able to sabotage the Ray, but it goes haywire and begins to zap Tethers and the agents, turning them insane. He rushes away with the Ray, moving the barrier blocking the Hidden People away from the campsite, allowing them to return home. Tethers attempts to throw the ray into Lake Svenz, but the thick layer of ice on the surface prevents it from falling through. Suddenly, the Sasquatch that Korka mentioned emerges from the trees near the lake and splits the ice, sinking the Ray to the bottom and ending its reign of lunacy over Scoggins.
 
Despite going against his orders from Director Jennings, Tethers is allowed to return to the FBI, although Ingraham is relocated for assisting Tethers while on the clock. Tethers receives a postcard from Isaac and Glori, who have happily reunited and are on vacation in Bermuda.

Reception

Puzzle Agent 2 was the first runner up for "Best Mobile Game" in the 1UP.com Best of E3 awards.  It was also the first runner up for "Best iPhone/iPad Game" and the second runner up for "Best Puzzle Game" in the IGN Best of E3 awards.

References

External links

2011 video games
Adventure games
IOS games
MacOS games
PlayStation Network games
Puzzle video games
Telltale Games games
Indie video games
Video game sequels
Video games about police officers
Video games based on comics
Video games developed in the United States
Video games scored by Jared Emerson-Johnson
Video games set in Minnesota
Windows games